Geoff Wheel (born 30 June 1951, in Swansea) is a former Wales international rugby union player who attained 32 international caps.  A lock-forward, he played club rugby for Mumbles RFC and then Swansea RFC.

Wheel made his international debut on 2 February 1974 versus Ireland and between 1974 and 1982 he formed a formidable second-row partnership for Wales with Allan Martin during the second 'golden-age' of the Wales international team.

A large uncompromising figure, Wheel had a noticeable twitch which only served to make him more intimidating. In 1977 Wheel, along with Willie Duggan of Ireland, became the first players to be sent off in a Five Nations international match.

Wheel is the organist in the Parish of St Thomas in Swansea where he also runs Geoff's Tuck Shop at the Boys Brigade every Wednesday. In 2011 he agreed to become the president of a Welsh male voice choir, the Swansea-based Gwalia Singers.

References

1951 births
Living people
Barbarian F.C. players
Rugby union players from Swansea
Swansea RFC players
Wales international rugby union players
Welsh rugby union players
Rugby union locks